Joan Ferrini-Mundy (born 1954) is a mathematics educator. Her research interests include calculus teaching and learning, mathematics teacher learning, and STEM education policy. She is currently the president of the University of Maine.

Career and research 
Ferrini-Mundy earned a Ph.D. in mathematics education from the University of New Hampshire (UNH) in 1980 and spent two years there as a postdoctoral associate.  After one year at Mount Holyoke College, she returned to UNH as a faculty member in mathematics until joining the faculty of Michigan State University in 1999. One year later, she chaired the writing group for Standards 2000, a publication from the National Council of Teachers of Mathematics.

In 2007, Ferrini-Mundy joined the National Science Foundation (NSF) as the director of the new Division of Research on Learning in Formal and Informal Settings in the Directorate for Education and Human Resources; she remained a faculty member at Michigan State until 2010.  From 2007 to 2009, she served on the education subcommittee of the National Science and Technology Council.

In February 2011, Ferrini-Mundy became the assistant director of the National Science Foundation's Directorate for Education and Human Resources. In this strategic role, she set the NSF's direction for scientific education. In 2014 she was elected to the executive committee of the Association for Women in Mathematics for a 2-year term.

In June 2017, she was appointed the chief operating officer of the NSF.  One year later, she left the NSF to become the 21st president of the University of Maine.

Awards and recognition 
In 2000, Ferrini-Mundy was the recipient of the Association for Women in Mathematics' Louise Hay Award.

In 2011, Ferrini-Mundy was elected as a Fellow at the American Association for the Advancement of Science
She was elected to the 2018 class of fellows of the American Mathematical Society.

References

External links 

American educators
American women mathematicians
Living people
1954 births
Fellows of the American Mathematical Society
University of New Hampshire alumni
Mount Holyoke College faculty
University of New Hampshire faculty
Michigan State University faculty
Presidents of the University of Maine
21st-century American women
Women heads of universities and colleges